Funk Power 1970: A Brand New Thang is the third of several James Brown era overviews released by Polydor Records in the mid-1990s. It covers 1970.

Track listing
Get Up I Feel Like Being a Sex Machine - 5:16
Super Bad - 9:03
Since You Been Gone - 4:58
previously unreleased original mix
Give It Up or Turn It a Loose - 6:24
undubbed unedited mix
There Was a Time (I Got to Move) - 7:20
previously unreleased
Talkin' Loud and Sayin' Nothing - 14:42
previously unreleased complete version
Get Up, Get into It, Get Involved - 7:06
Soul Power - 12:05
previously unreleased complete version
Get Up I Feel Like Being a Sex Machine - 10:31
previously unreleased undubbed mix
Fight Against Drug Abuse (Public Service Announcement) - 0:34

References

James Brown compilation albums
Polydor Records compilation albums